Parapsoriasis refers to one of a group of skin disorders that are characterized primarily by their resemblance to psoriasis (red, scaly lesions), rather than by their underlying cause.

Neoplasms can develop from parapsoriasis. For example, it can develop into cutaneous T-cell lymphoma.

The word "parapsoriasis" was formed in 1902.

Classification
The parapsoriasis groups, described and debated for nearly a century, has spawned a confusing nomenclature. There are some authors who prefer to limit the term "parapsoriasis" to large- and small-plaque variants only. However, the following classification scheme is now generally accepted:

 Large-plaque parapsoriasis
 Small-plaque parapsoriasis
 Pityriasis lichenoides
 Pityriasis lichenoides chronica
 Pityriasis lichenoides et varioliformis acuta
 Lymphomatoid papulosis

See also 
 Poikiloderma vasculare atrophicans
 List of cutaneous conditions

References

External links 

Papulosquamous hyperkeratotic cutaneous conditions